East of Eden is a 1981 American television miniseries based on John Steinbeck's 1952 novel of the same name. It aired in three parts on ABC from February 8–11, 1981. It was directed by Harvey Hart from a teleplay by Richard Shapiro, and starred Timothy Bottoms, Jane Seymour, Bruce Boxleitner, Soon Tek-Oh, Sam Bottoms, Hart Bochner, Karen Allen and Lloyd Bridges. It ran for roughly 382 minutes.

Plot
Following the Civil War, Union veteran Cyrus Trask has two sons: Adam, a gentle, idealistic soul; and Charles, a hellraiser. Cyrus favors Adam and Charles is very aware of it, creating friction between the brothers. Cyrus, by now an influential diplomat who has amassed a fortune by embezzling from the government, pulls strings to get Adam into West Point. Adam rebels, however, and goes off to lead the life of a vagabond. Following Cyrus' death, Adam returns to the family farm in Connecticut and mends his relationship with Charles, with whom he shares a large inheritance.

The series also concerns the life of Cathy Ames, an evil woman who delights in manipulating and destroying people. As a preteen girl (played by an uncredited actress), she falsely accuses two boys of trying to rape her.  At 16, she drives her naive Latin teacher to suicide by toying with his affections. She then murders her parents and runs away, eventually becoming the mistress of a whoremaster named Jules Edwards. When Edwards realizes she is using him, however, he gives her a severe beating and leaves her to die. Adam finds her and nurses her back to health, and soon falls in love with her. Charles sees through her, but soon he too succumbs to her charms and sleeps with her. Adam and Cathy move to the Salinas Valley in California, where Cathy gets pregnant and gives birth to twin boys. Shortly afterward, she tells Adam that she is leaving him, and shoots him in the shoulder when he tries to stop her.

Adam is devastated, but eventually recovers with help from his loyal Cantonese servant Lee and his old friend Samuel Hamilton. Lee and Hamilton relate to Adam the story of Cain and Abel, and tell him that God's admonition to Cain - "Timshel", Hebrew for "thou mayest" - symbolizes a human being's freedom to choose between good and evil and forge their own path in life. Inspired, Adam becomes a devoted father to his sons, whom he names Caleb ("Cal") and Aron. He tells them that their mother is dead.

Meanwhile, Cathy changes her name to Kate Albey and finds work at a whorehouse in Monterey. She endears herself to the madam, Faye, who eventually puts Kate in her will; Kate then murders her and takes over the whorehouse. Adam tries to win her back, but she rejects him and tells him that Charles is the boys' father. (It is left ambiguous whether she is telling the truth.)

The story moves ahead several years, with Cal and Aron as teenagers. They are opposites: Aron is virtuous and dutiful, Cal wild and rebellious. In a parallel situation to Adam and Charles, Cal believes that Adam favors Aron, and acts out to get his father's attention. Cal learns that Kate is still alive and goes to see her. Cal's goodness and professed love for his father makes Kate uncomfortable, and she spitefully tells him that he is just like her. Cal replies that she is merely afraid, and leaves.  On his way out, she tells him not to tell Aron.

When Adam goes nearly bankrupt after a bad investment, Cal resolves to prove his worth by making the money back. He goes into business with Samuel Hamilton's son Will growing beans, with the expectation that crop prices will skyrocket when the U.S. declares war on Germany. Their plan succeeds and they make a huge profit, which Cal proudly presents to his father. To his dismay, however, Adam rejects the gift as "dirty money". Cal lashes out by taking Aron to see Kate at the whorehouse and introducing her as their mother; Aron is horrified, and runs away to enlist in the war. Racked with guilt, Cal burns the money he made from the investment. Kate, meanwhile, loses her mind.

In the following months, Cal and Aron's girlfriend Abra fall in love. Tragedy strikes, however: Adam receives a telegram saying that Aron has been killed in battle, and suffers a debilitating stroke. Cal feels responsible, and confesses to Adam what he did. Lee tells the dying Adam that he must give his only remaining son his blessing so he can live a good life. With his last ounce of strength, Adam says one last word to Cal: "Timshel".

Cast
 Timothy Bottoms as Adam Trask
 Jane Seymour as Cathy Ames/Kate Albey
 Sam Bottoms as Cal Trask
 Hart Bochner as Aron Trask
 Bruce Boxleitner as Charles Trask
 Soon-Tek Oh as Lee
 Karen Allen as Abra
 Warren Oates as Cyrus Trask
 Lloyd Bridges as Samuel Hamilton
 Howard Duff as Jules Edwards
 Anne Baxter as Faye
 M. Emmet Walsh as Sheriff Horace Quinn
 Richard Masur as Will Hamilton
 Nicholas Pryor as James Grew 
 Nellie Bellflower as Mrs. Trask 
 Vernon Weddle as Bill Ames 
 Grace Zabriskie as Mrs. Ames 
 Wendell Burton as Tom Hamilton
 Matthew "Stymie" Beard as Cotton Eye 
 Timothy Carey as The Preacher

Production
The railroad scenes were filmed on the Sierra Railroad in Tuolumne County, California.

Reception
Seymour's performance as Cathy was critically acclaimed, winning her a Golden Globe for Best Actress in a Miniseries or Television Film.

The miniseries was a ratings success.  Part II was the second most-watched primetime television show in America for the week (28.1 rating, 21.9 million homes), and Part III was fourth (26.4 rating, 20.5 million homes).  Part I was ranked 15th for the prior week.

DVD release
East of Eden, in its original 1981 broadcast running time, was released on DVD on March 3, 2009. Previous VHS versions were severely truncated with several hours cut out.

References

External links
 East of Eden at imdb.com
 
 

1980s American television miniseries
1981 television films
1981 films
Television shows based on American novels
1981 drama films
American drama films
Patricide in fiction
Matricide in fiction
Films directed by Harvey Hart
Films scored by Lee Holdridge
Best Miniseries or Television Movie Golden Globe winners
1980s American films